The Mythological Cycle is a conventional grouping within Irish mythology. It consists of tales and poems about the god-like Tuatha Dé Danann, who are based on Ireland's pagan deities, and other mythical races such as the Fomorians and Fir Bolg. It is one of the four main story 'cycles' of early Irish myth and legend, along with the Ulster Cycle, the Fianna Cycle and the Cycles of the Kings. The name "Mythological Cycle" seems to have gained currency with Arbois de Jubainville . James MacKillop says the term is now "somewhat awkward", and John T. Koch notes it is "potentially misleading, in that the narratives in question represent only a small part of extant Irish mythology". He prefers T Ó Cathasaigh's name, Cycle of the Gods. Important works in the cycle are the Lebor Gabála Érenn ("Book of Invasions"), the Cath Maige Tuired ("Battle of Moytura"), the Aided Chlainne Lir ("Children of Lir") and Tochmarc Étaíne ("The Wooing of Étaín").

Overview 
The characters appearing in the cycle are essentially gods from the pre-Christian pagan past in Ireland. Commentators exercising caution, however, qualify them as representing only "godlike" beings, and not gods. This is because the Christian scribes who composed the writings were generally (though not always) careful not to refer to the Tuatha Dé Danann and other beings explicitly as deities. The disguises are thinly veiled nonetheless, and these writings contain discernible vestiges of early Irish polytheistic cosmology.

Examples of works from the cycle include numerous prose tales, verse texts, as well as pseudo-historical chronicles (primarily the Lebor Gabála Érenn (LGE), commonly called The Book of Invasions) found in medieval vellum manuscripts or later copies. Some of the romances are of later composition and found only in paper manuscripts dating to near-modern times (Cath Maige Tuired and The Fate of the Children of Tuireann).

Near-modern histories such as the Annals of the Four Masters and Geoffrey Keating's History of Ireland (=Seathrún Céitinn, Foras Feasa ar Éirinn) are also sometimes considered viable sources, since they may offer additional insights with their annotated and interpolated reworkings of Lebor Gabála Érenn accounts.

Orally transmitted folk-tales may also be, in a broad sense, considered mythological cycle material, notably, the folk-tales that describe Cian's tryst with Balor's daughter while attempting to recover the bountiful cow Glas Gaibhnenn.

The god-folk of the successive invasions are "euhemerised", i.e., described as having dwelt terrestrially and ruling over Ireland in kingship before the age of mortal men (the Milesians, or their descendants).
Afterwards, the Tuatha Dé Danann are said to have retreated into the sídhe (fairy mounds), cloaking their presence by raising the féth fiada (fairy mist).
Having disappeared but not died, the deities oftentimes make "guest appearances" in narratives categorised under other cycles. (e.g., Lugh's appearance as the divine father and Morrígan as nemesis to the Ulster hero Cuchulainn;
encounters of Finnian characters with dwellers of the sidhe; Cormac mac Airt's, or his grandfather's visits to the otherworldly realms.)

Collected literature, while they do not belong to the cycle in entirety, nevertheless capture tidbits of lore about the deities.

Lists of literature
The following table is a summary of titles of all of the mythological texts that survive and are in print. The sections that follow describe them in slightly more detail, by category (not shown here).

 Lebor Gabala Erenn [The Book of the Taking of Ireland]
 Introduction
 Redaction I 
 Redaction II
 Redaction III
 Miniugad
 O'Cleric's Recension

 Cath Maige Tured Conga [The First Battle of Mag Tured]
 Do Cath Mhuighe Tuireadh Ann So [The Second Battle of Mag Tured] (version A) 
 Do Cath Mhuighe Tuireadh Ann So [The Second Battle of Mag Tured] (version B) 
 Aided chloinne Tuireann [The Fate of the Children of Tuireann]
 Aided Chloinne Lir [The Fate of the Children of Lir]
 [The Fate of Sinann]
 Scel Tuain maic Cairill do Finnan Maige Bile inso sis [Tuan mac Cairill's Story to Finnen of Moville here below]

 The Colloquy between Fintan and the Hawk of Achill
 The Voyage of Bran

 The Tale of Etain
 The Wooing of Etain (version A)
 The Wooing of Etain (version B)
 The Wooing of Etain (version C)
 The Wooing of Etain (version D)
 The Nourishment of the House of the Two Pails

 The Taking of the Sid
 The Dream of Oengus

 The Tale of Mongan
 The Birth of Mongan
 A Story from which it is inferred that Mongan was Finn Mac Cumaill
 A Story of Mongan
 The Cause of Mongan's Frenzy
 The Conception of Mongan and Dub-Lacha's Love for Mongan
 Why Mongan was Deprived of Noble Issue

 The Settling of the Manor of Tara
 Fingen's Night Watch

History of the Mythological Cycle 
The main source of mythology comes from The Book of Invasions, or Lebor Gabala Erenn. It is an abridged compilation of both prose and poetry on the origins of Ireland and the extraordinary deities. The original was more expansive, but perished in what is to be assumed Viking raids, or being claimed during war time.

A supplemental text is attributed to a chronicler that goes by the name Keating, who published his book in the 17th century. He had access to materials that have not yet been published. Nennius and Eochaid Ua Flainn, chroniclers who lived during the 10th century, recorded mythological Irish history by way of poetry. Though, their contributions are short and semi-vague, they contain a lot of precious information on Ireland's spiritual beliefs of the time. The Tuatha De Danann can be linked to the same origins as the gods in Greek mythology. Hesiod calls the Greek Gods "the Golden Race," and similar attributes are seen in the Celtic gods.

In Irish mythology, Ireland was subject to 6 invasions. The first 5 were from otherworldy beings, and the last was from Milesians.

The Tuatha De Danann were known to come from the heavens, but that may be from scribes not knowing how to execute their origin. So the scribes borrowed from past religions like the Greek, Roman, and Eastern myth to create an origin story. The Gauls were thought to come from underneath the Earth. This information had been passed down from druids from Dispater, the God of the underworld.

Earth was thought to be a woman at the time, so this was thought to be a metaphorical birth, not ascending from hell. The earth, moon, and sun were thought to be created by druids, much like how Brahmans boasted the same cosmogony story. Much like preceding myth, the Gauls believed the trees and mountains held up the sky.

These stories stayed in the oral tradition because the Irish had not been invaded at the time, like surrounding countries. In conjunction, the druidic schools wanted to maintain the stories in verbal form. This kept the stories in circulation to the culture and public. When Christian scribes came to Ireland, they wrote down the stories in Latin. Unfortunately, in succeeding centuries many of the texts were lost or destroyed during Viking raids. The remaining texts were re-recorded in manuscripts in the 11th and 12th century. Though previous manuscripts were are dated to 3-4 centuries earlier in the Irish language.

History of the Tuatha Dé Danann 
The Tuatha Dé Danann are semi divine beings that came to Ireland by ships and inhabited the country before the native Irish. They came to Ireland to take the land from the Fir Bolgs that had already been residing in the north of Ireland at the time. The Tuatha were immediately perceived as gods for their superior skills: various arts of druidry, magic, prophecy and history. Their leader was named Nuada. He led them to war against the Fir Bolgs around the west shore of Ireland, where the Tuatha had arrived by ship. Many of the Tuatha died in this war, but thousands of Fir Bolgs died. Including their leader, Eochai Mac Erc. They come from another world, but reside in Ireland until they were pushed out by war with a semi-demonic race called the Fomorians. Their king is known in the mythology as Balor. The Fomorians resided on the outskirts of Ireland. When the Tuatha Dé Danann were defeated in battle against the Milesians, they were forced to live underground in the Sidhes. The Sidhes were chambers under Ireland's surface. Though away from the mortal world, they still would come to surface on special days like Hallowe'en and May Day.

Verse texts
Besides independent verses, a number of poems are embedded in prose tales, etc. A number of them are also preserved in the pseudohistorical Lebor Gabála Érenn, Keating, etc.

  ("Fintan and the Hawk of Aicill")
 Coire Érmai / Coire Goriath ("The Cauldron of Poesy")

Lore
Collected lore are not wholly of mythological content, but parts of it are. "The Fitness of Names" (#149–159, etc.) provides interesting explanations on names of Dian Cecht among others. Irish onomastica, the Dindshenchas, also include stories about deities such as Boann (under Inber Colptha), the Dagda (under Fidh nGaible), Brecan (Coire Brecain), often in developed narrative verse or prose tales. Genealogical tracts and the Roll of the Kings, various glosses (e.g. to the law treatise Senchus Mor) may also be culled for information.
 Banshenchas ("History of Women") 
 Cóir Anmann ("The Fitness of Names"): 
 Dindsenchas ("Lore of Places")
 Sanas Cormaic ("Cormac's Glossary"): Nes[s] (Nescoit)
 Triads of Ireland: mention of the indeoin Dagdai, ox of Díl, etc.

Pseudohistory
 Chronicon Scotorum
 Lebor Gabála Érenn

Folktales
 Glas Gaibhnenn

Prose tales
The following prose tales are described in greater depth in the following section.

Survey of prose tales
The euhemerised deities arrived in five sets of migrations (see Lebor Gabála Érenn), but none of the individual migrations tales (sing. tochomlod) survived intact.
Remnants of the migration tales are the summarised accounts given in the Lebor Gabála Érenn (Book of Invasions). Apart from these are the tale of Tuan mac Cairill, Fintan mac Bóchra colloquy. Tuan and Fintan are ancient beings from the Antediluvian past, who have reincaranted into different creatures, and are referred to in the Lebor Gabála Érenn as well.

Of the battle tales (sing. cath), the full narratives of the First and Second Battle of Moytura (Battles of Mag Tuired) survive in relatively late (16th century) manuscripts.
Other important battle tales such as the Cath Tailten (Battle of Tailten) or Orgain Tuir Chonaind ("Massacre of Conan's Tower") are lost, though abstracted in the Lebor Gabála Érenn.

The late romance of Oidheadh Chloinne Tuireann ("The Fate of the Children of Tuireann") tells how Lugh fines the sons of Tuireann for his father Cian's murder, compelling them to collect a series of magical objects and weapons which will be useful in the second battle of Mag Tuired against the Fomorians. An earlier version of this is recorded in the Lebor Gabála Érenn, with a somewhat different list of fines, with no indication the murder happened on the eve of the great battle.

In the Oidheadh Chloinne Lir ("The Fate of the Children of Lir"), the eponymous children are turned into swans by their jealous stepmother, and live in swan form into Christian times, when they are converted, transformed back into human form, and die of extreme old age.

Tochmarc Étaíne ("The Wooing of Étaín") tells first of the conception of Aengus through the adultery of the Dagda and Boann, and how Aengus won the residence of the Brú na Bóinne from Boann's husband Elcmar. It goes on to tell of the various lives of Étaín, wife of Midir, who is turned into a fly and driven away by Midir's jealous first wife Fuamnach. In her insect form  she becomes the companion of Aengus, until Fuamnach once again drives her away, and she is swallowed by a mortal woman and reborn as her daughter. Her beauty attracts the attention of the High King, Eochaid Airem, who marries her; ultimately her berift husband Midir uses magic and trickery to win her back.

There is also a curious account regarding Goídel Glas, the legendary ancestor of the migratory races and eponymous creator of the Gaelic language, and how he was cured by Moses's rod from a snake bite, related to in the Lebor Gabála Érenn, although Macalister is dismissive of it as fiction invented by glossators.

See also
List of High Kings of Ireland
Metrical Dindshenchas
Celtic astrology

Footnotes

References

Dictionaries

Critical studies

Primary sources
  (ed. & tr.) (CLC, English)
 , RC 48 (1931), 163–234 (snippet); (index), RC 49 (1932), 407–489 (snippet)(CLC, English)
  (ed. & tr.) (CLC, English)
  (auth. = tr. & ed.)

 
 
 
 
  (auth. = tr. & ed.)
  (auth. = tr. & ed.) cf. The Taking of the Síd-mound @ Paddy Brown's site.
  available via 
  (auth. = tr. & ed.)

External links

 — (Professor @ U. Illinois Urbana-Champaign)

 
Irish mythology
Early Irish literature
Ireland in fiction

pl:Mitologia irlandzka#Cykl Mitologiczny